Rod Santiago's The Sisters is the first TV adaptation of the classic Pinoy comic series written by Rod Santiago, which is the third dramaserye aired in Philippines by TV5 which was aired from July 18 to September 9, 2011, replacing Babaeng Hampaslupa and was replaced by Ang Utol Kong Hoodlum. starred by Nadine Samonte along with Leandro Muñoz and is directed by Joyce Bernal and Argel Joseph. The show marks Samonte's first project in TV5.

The film was originally a screenplay by Seiko Films with Pinky Suarez Jr and Rita Avila playing the original sisters Bella and Cristina in the film adaptation in 1987.

Synopsis
It features the compelling story of twins Cristina and Bella Santiago whose relationship is put to the test with the consequences of their personal choices and the obstacles that fate brings their way.

Story 
The Santiago twins Bella and Cristina (both portrayed by Nadine Samonte) may look exactly alike, but beneath their identical faces lies an extreme difference that entails their twisted fate. Cristina and Bella will also fall prey to the scheming ways of their vindictive aunt Socorro (Rio Locsin), who will stop at nothing to take everything from the sisters and their family. 
This new primetime series also brings back one of the most talented actors and sought after leading men to popular dramatic actresses, Leandro Muñoz. Portraying the role of the twins’ childhood friend Rafael, his character will be enmeshed in a complicated love triangle that will greatly affect the bond between the two sisters.

Cast

Main cast
Nadine Samonte as Bella /Christina
Leandro Muñoz as Rafael Leonidez
James Blanco as Dennis
Wendell Ramos as Dr. Arnel Moran

Extended cast
Eddie Garcia as Mayor Enrique Zialcita
Rio Locsin as Socorro Santiago
Zoren Legaspi as Fidel Santiago
Lotlot de Leon as Soledad Santiago
Alicia Alonzo as Yaya Maxima
Susan Africa as Carlota Zialcita
Tanya Garcia as Georgia
Perla Bautista as Consuelo
Andrea del Rosario as Daniela 
Victor Silayan as Warren Zialcita
Eula Caballero as Sheila
Edgar Allan Guzman as Jimmy
Rocky Gutierrez as Fredo

Cameo appearance
 Jestoni Alarcon as Eduardo Santiago
 Angel Jacob as Leticia Santiago
 Bobby Andrews as Young Enrique
 Meg Imperial as Young Socorro
 Paul Montecillo as Young Fidel
 Morissette Amon as Young Carlota
 Andrea Gonzales as Young Cristina
 Nicole Gonzales as Young Bella

The Santiago Family
Eduardo Santiago
Leticia Santiago
Socorro Santiago
Fidel Santiago
Soledad Santiago
Cristina Santiago
Bella Santiago

Soundtrack
The Sister's theme song is an exceptional rendition of the song Hiram performed by Faith Cuneta with Gerald Salonga's Philharmonic Orchestra.

Trivia
Both Lotlot De Leon and Zoren Legaspi have worked on GMA Network's recently ended Afternoon Drama Nita Negrita.
It is also Leandro Munoz comeback to Primetime Television via TV5 after 1999-2001 he starred in the ABS-CBN's Primetime Soap Saan Ka Man Naroroon & Sa Dulo Ng Walang Hanggan which ran from 2001-2003 after 8 years.
This marks Samonte's first Primetime Soap for TV5 after her transfer from GMA Network. Her final project in the said network is My Lover, My Wife.
It is also the Fourth Primetime Television Series for TV5 replacing the successful Primetime Offering Babaeng Hampaslupa, Mga Nagbabagang Bulaklak and My Driver Sweet Lover.
The First Primetime TV Series filmed and shot in HD.
This is newcomer Victor Silayan's first acting role. He has been seen in commercials such as Lucky Me! and Stresstabs. He also took part in the Bench Uncut Fashion Show. He is related to former Beauty Queen, and late Chat Silayan and actor Vic Silayan.
This theme song used on its same name of the theme song of Hiram which aired in ABS-CBN way back in 2004, performed by Zsa Zsa Padilla after Palimos ng Pag-ibig (both 1986 original Filipino film then a TV series remake in the first Sineserye Presents installment).

See also
List of programs aired by TV5 (Philippine TV network)

References

TV5 (Philippine TV network) drama series
2011 Philippine television series debuts
2011 Philippine television series endings
Philippine drama television series
Television shows based on comics
Filipino-language television shows